YZ Ceti is a red dwarf star in the constellation Cetus. Although it is relatively close to the Sun at just 12 light years, this star cannot be seen with the naked eye. It is classified as a flare star that undergoes intermittent fluctuations in luminosity. YZ Ceti is about 13 percent the mass of the Sun and 17% of its radius.

This star is unusually close to Tau Ceti, a star of spectral class G8. The two are only about 1.6 light years apart, a little more than a third of the distance from the Sun to the Solar System's nearest neighbor, Proxima Centauri.

Variability

YZ Ceti is a variable star designation: the star shows occasional rapid and brief increases in brightness, sometimes reaching magnitude 12.03, caused by eruptions from the surface.  This type of variable star is known as a UV Ceti star after its first member, or more colloquially as a flare star.

YZ Ceti also shows small periodic variations in brightness caused by starspots or chromospheric features moving as the star rotates.  This class of variable stars are known as BY Draconis variables.  The periodic variations allow the rotational period of the star to be measured at 68.3 days, although modelling of its planetary system gives a rotational period for the star of 83 days.

Planetary system
On 10 August 2017 three planets were announced to have been discovered around YZ Ceti and a possible fourth sub-Earth planet candidate, still needing confirmation, with 0.472±0.096 Earth masses at an orbital period of 1.04 days. The orbits of the three confirmed planets were determined to be too close to YZ Ceti to be within the star's habitable zone, with equilibrium temperatures ranging from 347–491 K (74–218 °C; 165–424 °F), 299–423 K (26–150 °C; 79–302 °F), and 260–368 K (−13–95 °C; 8–203 °F) for planets b, c, and d, respectively.

An August 2018 study reexamined the discovery measurements, confirming the orbit of YZ Ceti d, but finding a possibly marginally longer orbital period of YZ Ceti b of 2.02 days rather than 1.97 days, and additionally finding that YZ Ceti c probably orbits in only 0.75 days rather than 3.06 days. If the latter is true, YZ Ceti c would have a mass of only 0.58 Earth masses and a roughly 10% chance of transiting YZ Ceti. However, a 2020 study did not support the latter conclusion, finding the 0.75-day period to be an alias of the true 3.06-day period. It also did not find evidence for the fourth candidate planet.

See also
 List of nearest stars

References

External links
 ARICNS

Cetus (constellation)
Local Bubble
M-type main-sequence stars
Flare stars
005643
0054.1
Ceti, YZ
Planetary systems with three confirmed planets
J01123052-1659570
Emission-line stars
BY Draconis variables